Macarena Alexanderson Álvarez (born 16 February 1972) is a Mexican diver. She competed in the women's 10 metre platform event at the 1992 Summer Olympics.

References

External links
 

1972 births
Living people
Mexican female divers
Olympic divers of Mexico
Divers at the 1992 Summer Olympics
Place of birth missing (living people)